Friedrich von Müller (17 September 1858, Augsburg – 18 November 1941, Munich) was a German physician remembered for describing Müller's sign. He was the son of the head of the medical department in the hospital in Augsburg. He studied natural sciences in Munich and medicine in Munich, under Carl von Voit, and Würzburg. He was awarded his doctorate in Munich in 1882, and became assistant to Carl Jakob Adolf Christian Gerhardt in Würzburg and later Berlin. He was habilitated in internal medicine in 1888 and became professor of clinical propaedeutics and laryngology in Bonn. He moved to Breslau in 1890, Marburg in 1892, and Basel in 1899, before returning to Munich in 1902.
His approach to clinical teaching and how to improve medical education were widely recognised and influenced medical education in the UK and USA.

In 1907 he became knight, 1911 Hofrat and 1913 Geheimrat in the Kingdom of Bavaria. 1933 he got the Adlerschild des Deutschen Reiches (Eagle Shield of the German Empire) with the dedication "DEM GROSSEN KLINIKER" (the great clinician).
In 1922 he became a member of the German Academy of Sciences Leopoldina (Deutsche Akademie der Naturforscher Leopoldina). From 1927 to 1934 he was president of the Deutsche Akademie, a German cultural institute.
1927 the city of Munich made him to an Honorary Citizen (comp. List of honorary citizens of Munich).

References

External links 
 
 

German otolaryngologists
1858 births
1941 deaths
Physicians from Augsburg